Hiel Brockway was a native of Lyme, Connecticut and came to Clarkson, New York shortly after the War of 1812. Upon arrival, he built and operated a tavern. He was a town builder and the first resident of the village that bears his name. Seizing the opportunity offered by the canal, he speculated the land by building many of the first houses. Brockway owned a brickyard which produced most of the material for their construction. He also owned a shipyard and later operated a packet service on the canal.

Brockway and Seymour, both civic and business minded, donated land for the construction of schools and churches. It was Brockway that contributed the land for the original campus. Shrewd and industrious, but a man of foresight and vision, the founder of Brockport, New York was typical of, and pre-eminent among, the New England immigrants who were the first settlers in the area. Already in the prime of life and father of thirteen children when his village was settled, Hiel Brockway continued to reside in Brockport until his death in 1842.

References

 "The Brockway Family. Some Records of Wolston Brockway, and His Descendants," Printed in Owego, NY: 1890 by Leon L. Brockway's Power Print

Year of birth unknown
1842 deaths
People from Lyme, Connecticut
People from Brockport, New York
19th-century American businesspeople